Charles McVay may refer to:

 Charles B. McVay, Jr. (1868–1949), admiral in the U.S. Navy during World War I
 Charles B. McVay III (1898–1968), captain of the USS Indianapolis during World War II